William Dickson, also known as Bill Dickson or Billy Dickson (15 March 1923 – 31 May 2002), was a Northern Irish footballer who played at both professional and international levels as a wing half.

Career

Club career
Born in Lurgan, Dickson began his career with hometown club Glenavon, before moving to England in November 1945 to sign with Notts County. Dickson also played in England for Chelsea, Arsenal and Mansfield Town, making a total of 170 appearances in the Football League for all four clubs. Dickson retired due to a shoulder injury in 1957, before returning briefly to play with first club Glenavon in January 1958.

International career
Dickson earned a total of twelve caps for Northern Ireland between 1951 and 1954.

References

1923 births
2002 deaths
Association footballers from Northern Ireland
Northern Ireland international footballers
Glenavon F.C. players
Notts County F.C. players
Chelsea F.C. players
Arsenal F.C. players
Mansfield Town F.C. players
English Football League players
Association football midfielders